Shauna Melinda Howe (July 11, 1981 – October 27, 1992) was an 11-year-old girl from Oil City, Pennsylvania, who was raped and murdered on October 27, 1992. Howe's kidnapping and murder by being thrown from a bridge became a cause célèbre in Pennsylvania, receiving widespread media attention for over a decade.     
In September/October 2005, Eldred “Ted” Walker, James O'Brien, and Timothy O'Brien were convicted for participation in Howe's murder.

Background
Around 8pm on October 27, Howe was walking home from a Girl Scouts Halloween party in Oil City, Pennsylvania, when she was abducted at the corner of West First Street and Reed Street, two blocks from home. A local resident, Dan Paton, witnessed the kidnapping, providing investigators with details of the circumstances, the abductor and the getaway vehicle used.

Two days later, investigators found a piece of Howe's gymnastic costume near an abandoned railroad bed in a rural, wooded area in the nearby township of Rockland, which was identified by her stepfather as being Shauna's. The next morning, Howe's body was found about 200 yards from where the clothing was found, along with a candy wrapper and her shoes. Howe's abductors had thrown her alive from a railroad trestle bridge into a dry, rocky creek bed near Coulter's Hole in Rockland, and she had died of blunt force trauma to the head and chest caused by the fall.

Investigation
The mystery of Howe's disappearance and murder continued for nearly ten years until the investigation had a major breakthrough. In 2002, a DNA sample taken from Oil City resident James O'Brien, who was serving a prison sentence for attempting to kidnap an Oil City woman in 1995, matched a sample of seminal DNA found on Howe's body in tests run by the FBI lab in Washington, D.C. O’Brien had not been a suspect earlier as investigators mistakenly believed he was in jail at the time of the attack, and neither of the brothers fit the eyewitness description.

The DNA revelation intensified the investigation, with increased presence in the area by the FBI and the Pennsylvania State Police, with the latter searching the home of Eldred "Ted" Walker, who said he may have opened his home to some "really bad" people once who may have done "a disgusting thing." An early suspect, Walker and one of his vehicles had resembled those provided by the witness, but the investigation at the time stalled as his DNA did not match.

Trial 
In September 2005, Walker, as part of a plea bargain, pleaded guilty to kidnapping and third degree murder and agreed to testify against the O'Brien brothers. In court, he admitted grabbing Howe and passing her to the O’Briens who were waiting in a parked car. He also admitted knowing the brothers were upstairs in his house with the girl as he heard her crying. He, however, denied any involvement in her death.

On what would be the eve of the 13 year anniversary of Shauna's disappearance, the O'Brien brothers learned their fate.
 
After nearly 17 hours of deliberations, the Indiana County jury had come to a  verdict.
In the end, the jury found the brothers; guilty of second degree murder, guilty of third-degree murder, guilty of involuntary deviate sexual intercourse, and guilty of kidnapping and criminal conspiracy to commit kidnapping.

The brother's convictions for second degree murder (otherwise known as felony murder) carries a mandatory lifetime sentence without the possibility of parole.
Second degree murder is not considered premeditated, instead the law categorizes it as a murder which occurs during the commission of a felony crime (such as a kidnapping).

As for the more serious charges of first degree murder and rape, the O'Briens were acquitted of those charges.
According to the law, in order for a jury to find a
defendant guilty of first degree murder, the jury must be convinced that the
killing was premeditated and deliberate, which the jury deemed that the prosecution had not proven.

The verdicts brought the long-awaited 13 year murder case to its conclusion.

Legacy
Following Howe's murder, the Oil City Council voted to prohibit night-time trick-or-treating. The ban remained in place for 15 years, before being lifted in time for Halloween 2008.

See also
List of kidnappings
List of solved missing person cases

References

1981 births
1990s missing person cases
1992 deaths
1992 murders in the United States
Deaths by defenestration
Deaths by person in Pennsylvania
Female murder victims
Kidnapped American children
Missing person cases in Pennsylvania
Murdered American children
People murdered in Pennsylvania
Oil City, Pennsylvania
Incidents of violence against girls